Silvia Njirić and Dejana Radanović were the defending champions but chose not to participate.

Barbara Haas and Katarzyna Kawa won the title, defeating Andreea Prisăcariu and Nika Radišić in the final, 7–6(7–1), 5–7, [10–6].

Seeds

Draw

Draw

References
Main Draw

Zagreb Ladies Open - Doubles
Zagreb Ladies Open